Terry Dowdall  (born 1964 or 1965) is a Canadian politician who was elected to represent the riding of Simcoe—Grey in the House of Commons of Canada in the 2019 Canadian federal election. He is a former mayor of Essa, Ontario.

Electoral record

Federal

Municipal

References

External links

Living people
Conservative Party of Canada MPs
Members of the House of Commons of Canada from Ontario
Year of birth uncertain
Mayors of places in Ontario
Politicians from Simcoe County
Year of birth missing (living people)
People from Clearview, Ontario